Versatile is a Canadian agricultural machinery manufacturer. The company was founded in 1963 by Peter Pakosh and Roy Robinson in Winnipeg, Manitoba, Canada. At one time it had 70% of the 4WD tractor market.

History 
Versatile was the first company to mass-produce articulated four-wheel-drive tractors, starting in 1966 with the D100 and G100 four-wheel drives. Those ground-breaking tractors were primitive by modern standards, with a 6-cylinder diesel or 8-cylinder gas engine producing 100 horsepower. 1966 models sold for less than CA$10,000.

Daniel Pakosh also developed the first bi-directional tractor in the world. The Versatile 150 launched in 1977.

The Versatile brand, known historically for four-wheel drive tractors, has expanded to include front-wheel assist tractors after acquiring the rights to a few of New Hollands tractors during the CNH merger, self-propelled sprayers, precision seeding & tillage equipment, and combines. In its earlier days (1970s to 1980s), the company made iconic tractors colored red, yellow, and black. The tractors were also known for their flat, boxy appearance, and hardly any curvature as seen on modern tractors. An example of this, the Versatile 856, is to the left.

Four-wheel drive demand increased significantly, with Versatile becoming one of the leaders in four-wheel-drive development and production. By the late 1970s, the Versatile lineup included tractors ranging from 220 to 330 horsepower. With the 1980s came an expanded line of four-wheel-drive tractors that stretched to 470 horsepower in the Versatile 1150. They entered the race to build the largest tractor in the world with "Big Roy", named after one of the founders, in 1977. Roy produced 600 HP on the draw bar.

In 1987, Ford-New Holland bought Versatile. Ford New Holland quickly started assimilating the Versatile range of tractors, the decals were replaced with the Ford name and Versatile name was reduced in size and placed below the model number. Additionally, the iconic Versatile colors were replaced with the blue and white of the Ford tractors. Throughout Versatile's time under Ford-New Holland, various changes and updates were made to the line. Two of the most notable changes were the transition from the flat square sheetmetal, to a more rounded and modernized design, and the addition of a powershift transmission.

In 1991, Fiat Geotech purchased Ford New Holland to create New Holland. Then in 1999, New Holland merged with Case Corporation to create CNH Global. As part of this merger, Versatile had to be sold, as the Case Corporation had the Steiger brand since 1986. Versatile was sold to Buhler Industries Incorporated, returning the iconic red to the tractors, but replacing yellow with white.

On November 1, 2007, Combine manufacturer Rostselmash Inc. acquired 80% of the common shares of Versatile and it was announced that the Versatile brand name will again be the sole name associated with the tractor division.

In 2016, Versatile expanded its tractor range by adding the DeltaTrack system of four tracks replacement of the wheels on their Articulated tractors. In 2017 Versatile returned to its iconic color scheme of red, yellow, and black.

In August 2022, Versatile announced plans for a hydrogen powered tractor, using a 15L Cummins engine.

Models

4 Wheel Drives (Articulated)

Bi-Directional Tractors

MFWD Tractors

References

 Versatile Tractors (A Farmer Boy's Dream), by Jarrod Pakosh, published by Japonica Press,

External links

 
 
 

Tractor manufacturers of Canada
Manufacturing companies based in Winnipeg
Vehicle manufacturing companies established in 1966
1966 establishments in Canada
Canadian brands